Merchiston is an unincorporated community in Nance County, Nebraska, in the United States.

History
Merchiston was a depot on the Union Pacific Railroad.

References

Unincorporated communities in Nance County, Nebraska
Unincorporated communities in Nebraska